Club Real Potosí is a Bolivian football club based in Potosí. Founded on 1 April 1988, in 2022 it will play in the Potosí Football Association Championship, after being relegated from the Bolivian Primera División in 2021, holding home games at Estadio Víctor Agustín Ugarte, with a 32,000-seat capacity.

History
Real Potosí was founded on 1 April 1988, as Fútbol Academy of Real Potosì. They subsequently merged with Banco Minero of Bolivia (Bamin), which was founded on 20 October 1941.

The club played their first continental competition, the Copa Libertadores, in 2002. They were drawn with Peñarol of Uruguay, El Nacional of Ecuador, and San Lorenzo de Almagro of Argentina. Even though they came in last place, they beat San Lorenzo 1-0 and thrashed Peñarol 6-1. The reason for the strange one-sided result was most likely due to the high elevation of the stadium (4,000 metres), since the team had lost the away leg 4-0. 

In 2007 Real Potosi became champion of the Apertura tournament, earning qualification for that year's Copa Libertadores. The following year they won the Copa Aerosur del Sur and Torneo Play Off.

Real Potosí gained popularity by being announced as one of the opponents of Flamengo and Paraná Clube in the 2007 Copa Libertadores, by forcing teams to play in the city of Potosí, at 4,090 metres (13,200 feet) above the sea level. They came in third place in the group, recording a 3-1 victory against Parana, and were undefeated at home, despite getting no away wins. 

The following year Cruzeiro played against Real Potosí, losing 5-1, despite having won 3-0 in Brazil, and 2009 Palmeiras was the most famous opponent, eliminating Real from the tournament.

Stadium
The Estadio Víctor Agustín Ugarte is a Bolivian football stadium located in Potosí, which seats 32,000 fans.

The stadium was originally called Estadio San Clemente, but was renamed Mario Mercado Vaca Guzmán after some modifications on the structure, including new illumination towers, were made.
Newer modifications led ultimately to its actual name.

Located 4,090 metres above sea level, the stadium is one of the highest in the world. It has raised numerous controversies in footballing circles, as its significant altitude affects the absorption of oxygen in the human body, offering considerable advantage to the home team who are more accustomed to such conditions.

Current squad

Rivalries 

The club has a rivalry with the only other first division club in the Potosí Department, Nacional Potosí. They share the same stadium, and matches between them usually draw lots of attention. 

The first match played between the two clubs was in the 2009 Copa Aerosur on 18 January 2009. Real Potosi won 2-1. The first league match between the two clubs was on 19 April 2009, which finished in a 1-1 draw. 

Although both clubs were founded in the 20th century, the reason why it took so long for both clubs to meet was because Nacional Potosi had been playing in the lower divisions until 2009. Nacional Potosí have won 18 times, while Real Potosí have only done it 15 times, there were 11 draws.

Honours

Domestic
First Division – Professional Era: 1
Winners (1): 2007-A
Runner-up (4): 2004-C, 2006-A, 2006-C, 2011-A
Torneo de Play-Off: 2
Winners (2): 2008, 2009
Second Division, Copa Simón Bolivar: 1
Winners (1): 1997

Performance in CONMEBOL competitions
Copa Libertadores: 6 appearances
2002 – First Round
2007 – First Round
2008 – First Round
2009 – Preliminary Round
2010 – Preliminary Round
2012 – Preliminary Round

Copa Sudamericana: 4 appearances
2007 – First Round
2013 – First Round
2015 – First Round
2016 – Second Round

Notable managers
 Félix Berdeja
 Mauricio Soria (10 April 2007–14 March 08)
 Vladimir Soria (16 Sept 2009–25 Sept 11)
 Dalcio Giovagnoli (2011)
 Victor Zwenger (28 Nov 2011–10 Feb 12)
 Julio César Baldivieso (10 Feb 2012–18 May 12)
 Óscar Sanz (3 June 2012 – 2013)
 Fernando Ochoaizpur (December 2018 – March 2019)

References

 
Association football clubs established in 1941
Real Potosi
1941 establishments in Bolivia